Lee Seo-jin (born January 30, 1971) is a South Korean actor. He is best known for the reality shows Three Meals a Day and Grandpa Over Flowers. As an actor, he came to prominence with his leading roles in television series Damo (2003), Phoenix (2004), Lovers (2006), Yi San (2007) and Marriage Contract (2016).

Career
Lee Seo-jin made his acting debut in 1999 in the television series House Above the Waves. After several supporting roles on TV, he rose to fame in the 2003 hit period drama Damo, followed by the also popular contemporary drama Phoenix in 2004. Lee then landed his first big screen leading role in the 2005 action blockbuster Shadowless Sword.

Lee played a vampire in the cable series Freeze (2006), a gangster in Lovers (2006), and a criminal profiler in Soul (2009). However, he became well-known for his portrayals of Korean historical characters King Jeongjo of Joseon in Yi San (2007), and General Gyebaek of Baekje in Gyebaek (2011).

Other activities
Lee comes from a family with strong ties in the financial sector, and believed to be involved in the banking, transportation and tourism industries, among others. He has a Business Management degree from the New York University Stern School of Business. In 2011, Lee joined the company Ask Veritas Assets Management, which specializes in intellectual property and real estate investment. He was appointed as managing director for the firm's second global contents division.

A regular volunteer of Habitat for Humanity since 2006, he was appointed its Goodwill Ambassador for Korea in 2008. Together with the Nippon Foundation and South Korean food franchise Genesis, Lee established the "Let's Tree Fund" in 2010 to conduct reforestation activities. In 2011, Lee joined relief efforts for victims of the Japanese earthquake and tsunami. Like many celebrities, Lee also publicly protested the forced repatriation of North Korean defectors.

Filmography

Film

Television series

Web series

Television show

Music video
 Forever (SKY, 1999)
 Lieblich (Boohwal, 2000)
 Goodbye (Jung Jae-wook, 2001)
 Where Are You? (Yim Jae-beom for Ditto 3 compilation album, 2004)

Theater
 Shakespearean Love Method (2000)

Awards and nominations

State honors

Listicles

Notes

References

External links

Lee Seo-jin official Korean website 
Lee Seo-jin official Japanese website 

1971 births
Living people
20th-century South Korean male actors
21st-century South Korean male actors
South Korean male film actors
South Korean male television actors
New York University alumni
Goseong Lee clan